This is a list of the weekly Canadian RPM magazine number one Top Singles chart of 1970.

See also 
1970 in music

List of Billboard Hot 100 number ones of 1970
List of Cashbox Top 100 number-one singles of 1970

References
Notes

External links
 Read about RPM Magazine at the AV Trust
 Search RPM charts here at Library and Archives Canada

 
1970 record charts
1970